Microspora is a genus of green algae in the family Microsporaceae. Microspora are autotrophic protists that are often characterized by their many segments.

References

Sphaeropleales genera
Sphaeropleales